Glass bead making has long traditions, with the oldest known beads dating over 3,000 years. Glass beads have been dated back to at least Roman times.  Perhaps the earliest glass-like beads were Egyptian faience beads, a form of clay bead with a self-forming vitreous coating. Glass beads are significant in archaeology because the presence of glass beads often indicate that there was trade and that the bead making technology was being spread. In addition, the composition of the glass beads could be analyzed and help archaeologists understand the sources of the beads.

Common types of glass bead manufacture
Glass beads are usually categorized by the method used to manipulate the glass – wound beads, drawn beads, and molded beads.  There are composites, such as millefiori beads, where cross-sections of a drawn glass cane are applied to a wound glass core.  A very minor industry in blown glass beads also existed in 19th-century Venice and France.

Wound glass beads
Probably the earliest beads of true glass were made by the winding method.  Glass at a temperature high enough to make it workable, or "ductile", is laid down or wound around a steel wire or mandrel coated in a clay slip called "bead release".  The wound bead, while still hot, may be further shaped by manipulating with graphite, wood, stainless steel, brass, tungsten or marble tools and paddles. This process is called marvering, originating from the French word "marbrer" which translates to "marble". It can also be pressed into a mold in its molten state. While still hot, or after re-heating, the surface of the bead may be decorated with fine rods of colored glass called stringers creating a type of lampwork bead.

Drawn glass beads
The drawing of glass is also ancient.  Evidence of large-scale drawn-glass bead making has been found by archeologists in India, at sites like Arekamedu dating to the 2nd century CE.  The small drawn beads made by that industry have been called Indo-Pacific beads, because they may have been the single most widely traded item in history—found from the islands of the Pacific to Great Zimbabwe in southern Africa.

There are several methods for making drawn beads, but they all involve pulling a strand out of a gather of glass in such a way as to incorporate a bubble in the center of the strand to serve as the hole in the bead. In Arekamedu this was accomplished by inserting a hollow metal tube into the ball of hot glass and pulling the glass strand out around it, to form a continuous glass tube. In the Venetian bead industry, molten glass was gathered on the end of a tool called a puntile ("puntying up"), a bubble was incorporated into the center of a gather of molten glass, and a second puntile was attached before stretching the gather with its internal bubble into a long cane. The drawn tube was then chopped, producing individual drawn beads from its slices. The resulting beads were cooked or rolled in hot sand to round the edges without melting the holes closed; were sieved into sizes; and, usually, strung onto hanks for sale.

The most common type of modern glass bead is the seed bead, a small type of bead typically less than 6 mm, traditionally monochrome, and manufactured in very large quantities. They are a modern example of mechanically-drawn glass beads. The micro-bead or "seed bead", are so called due to their tiny, regular size. Modern seed beads are extruded by machine and some, such as Miyuki delicas, look like small tubes.

Molded beads

Pressed or molded beads are associated with lower labour costs. These were commonly produced in the Czech Republic in the early 20th century. Thick glass rods are heated to molten and fed into a complex apparatus that stamps the glass, including a needle that pierces a hole. The beads again are rolled in hot sand to remove flashing and soften seam lines. By making canes (the glass rods fed into the machine) striped or otherwise patterned, the resulting beads can be more elaborately colored than seed beads. One "feed" of a hot rod might result in 10–20 beads, and a single operator can make thousands in a day. Glass beads are also manufactured or moulded using a rotary machine where molten glass is fed in to the centre of a rotary mould and solid or hollow glass beads are formed. 

The Bohemian glass industry was known for its ability to copy more expensive beads, and produced molded glass "lion's teeth", "coral", and "shells", which were popular in the 19th and early 20th century Africa trade.

Lampwork beads

A variant of the wound glass bead making technique, and a labor-intensive one, is what is traditionally called lampworking.  In the Venetian industry, where very large quantities of beads were produced in the 19th century for the African trade, the core of a decorated bead was produced from molten glass at furnace temperatures, a large-scale industrial process dominated by men.  The delicate multicolored decoration was then added by people, mostly women, working at home using an oil lamp or spirit lamp to re-heat the cores and the fine wisps of colored glass used to decorate them.  These workers were paid on a piecework basis for the resulting lampwork beads.  Modern lampwork beads are made by using a gas torch to heat a rod of glass and spinning the resulting thread around a metal rod covered in bead release. When the base bead has been formed, other colors of glass can be added to the surface to create many designs. After this initial stage of the bead making process, the bead can be further fired in a kiln to make it more durable.

Modern bead makers use single or dual fuel torches, so `flameworked' is replacing the older term. Unlike a metalworking torch, or burner as some people in the trade prefer to call them, a flameworking torch is usually "surface mix"; that is, the oxygen and fuel (typically propane, though natural gas is also common) is mixed after it comes out of the torch, resulting in a quieter tool and less dirty flame.  Also unlike metalworking, the torch is fixed, and the bead and glass move in the flame.  American torches are usually mounted at about a 45 degree angle, a result of scientific glassblowing heritage; Japanese torches are recessed, and have flames coming straight up, like a large bunsen burner; Czech production torches tend to be positioned nearly horizontally.

Dichroic glass beads
Increasingly, dichroic glass is being used to produce high-end art beads.  Dichroic glass has a thin film of metal fused to the surface of the glass, resulting in a surface that has a metallic sheen that changes between two colors when viewed at different angles.  Beads can be pressed, or made with traditional lampworking techniques.  If the glass is kept in the flame too long, the metallic coating will turn silver and burn off.

Furnace glass
Italian glass blowing techniques such as latticinio and zanfirico are adapted here to make beads.  Furnace glass uses large decorated canes built up out of smaller canes, encased in clear glass and then extruded to form the beads with linear and twisting stripe patterns. No air is blown into the glass. These beads require a large scale glass furnace and annealing kiln for manufacture.

Lead crystal
Lead crystal beads are machine cut and polished.  Their high lead content makes them sparkle more than other glass, but also makes them inherently fragile.

Other methods

Lead glass (for neon signs) and, especially borosilicate is available in tubing, allowing for glass blown beads. (Soda-lime glass can be blown at the end of a metal tube, or, more commonly wound on the mandrel to make a hollow bead, but the former is unusual and the latter not a true mouth-blown technique.)  In addition, beads can be fused from sheet glass or using ground glass.

Modern Ghana has an industry in beads molded from powdered glass.  Also in Africa, Kiffa beads are made in Mauritania, historically by women, using powdered glass that the bead maker usually grinds herself from commercially available glass seed beads and recycled glass.

Molded ground glass, if painted into the mold, is called pate de verre, and the technique can be used to make beads, though pendants and cabochons are more typical.  Lampwork (and other) beads can be painted with glass paints.

See also

 Beads
 Murano beads
 Glass art
 Glass bead road surface marking

References

Glass art
Glass production
Beadwork